Thomas Richardson Loudon (born September 1, 1883 – died January 6, 1968) was a Canadian coxswain who competed in the 1904 Summer Olympics.

Loudon was born in 1883 in Toronto, Ontario. In 1904, he coxed the Canadian boat which won the silver medal in the men's eight. He died in 1968 in his birth city.

Notes

References

External links
 Database Olympics profile

1883 births
1968 deaths
Canadian male rowers
Olympic rowers of Canada
Rowers at the 1904 Summer Olympics
Olympic silver medalists for Canada
Olympic medalists in rowing
Medalists at the 1904 Summer Olympics
Coxswains (rowing)
Rowers from Toronto